Jacks Creek is the eighth studio album by American experimental rock band Sun City Girls, released in 1995 by Abduction Records.

Track listing

Personnel
Adapted from the Jacks Creek liner notes.

Sun City Girls
 Alan Bishop – bass guitar, vocals
 Richard Bishop – guitar, vocals
 Charles Gocher – drums, percussion, vocals

Production and additional personnel
 Scott Colburn – production, engineering
 Sun City Girls – production

Release history

References

External links 
 

1995 albums
Sun City Girls albums